"Coup d'Etat" was a 2004 comic book crossover storyline published by Wildstorm Comics.

Publication history
The story ran across 4 issues, each featuring one of the major titles in the Wildstorm Universe at that time: Sleeper, Stormwatch: Team Achilles, Wildcats 3.0 and The Authority. Each issue of the overarching storyline, which Jim Lee described as a  "stand alone 4 part mini-series event", is a one-shot focusing on one of the four different groups and created by their respective writers and artists.

There was also an "Afterword" issue including a preview to the second volume of Sleeper and a preview to the second volume of Wetworks, which was launched in mid-2006 by creator Whilce Portacio and writer Mike Carey.

Plot
In Coup d'Etat, Tao places a device in the hands of the U.S. Government that allows them to enter the Bleed, where it exploded, damaging a vessel of an alien race and starting an interdimensional war. The crossover had important consequences for the Wildstorm Universe with the Authority taking control over the U.S. Government and Stormwatch: Team Achilles being forced underground.

For Stormwatch: Team Achilles and Wildcats 3.0, most of these consequences could not be explored as both series were cancelled shortly afterwards. The Authority taking control of the U.S. Government led into the events of The Authority: Revolution.

Reception
Both the "Sleeper" and "Afterword" issues sold out, despite of what DC described as "generous overprints".

Collected editions
The story was collected into a trade paperback:

 Coup d'Etat (collects "Sleeper", "Stormwatch: Team Achilles", "Wildcats 3.0" and "The Authority" in that order, 112 pages, November 2004)

See also
 List of Wildstorm titles
 Wildstorm: Armageddon, another Wildstorm series where each issue was from a different Wildstorm title

Notes

References

External links
Review of "Afterword", Comics Bulletin

WildStorm storylines